Greg Nelson may refer to:
Greg Nelson (producer) (born 1948), music producer
Greg Nelson (make-up artist), Academy Award nominated make-up artist
Greg Nelson (computer scientist) (1912–2015), American computer scientist
Greg Nelson and Jenny Gardner, fictional characters from All My Children
Greg Nelson (curler) on List of teams on the 2012–13 Ontario Curling Tour
Greg Nelson (playwright) of Afghanada
Greg Nelson (politician) in Louisiana gubernatorial election, 1979

See also
Gregory Nelson (disambiguation)